The 1923 Toledo Maroons season was their second in the league. The team failed to improve on their previous output of 5–2–2, winning only three games. They finished tenth in the league.

Schedule

Standings

Players
 Don Batchelor
 Marty Conrad
 Guil Falcon
 Frani FitzGerald
 Joe Gillis
 Harry Hill
 Steamer Horning
 Ben Hunt
 Cliff Jetmore
 Jerry Jones
 Heinie Kirkgard
 Hal Lauer
 Tom McNamara
 Chuck O'Neil
 Si Seyfrit
 Dutch Strauss
 Tillie Voss
 Rat Watson
 Wilbur White

References

Toledo Maroons seasons
Toledo Maroons
Toledo